The Giller Prize (sponsored as the Scotiabank Giller Prize), is a literary award given to a Canadian author of a novel or short story collection published in English (including translation) the previous year, after an annual juried competition between publishers who submit entries. The prize was established in 1994 by Toronto businessman Jack Rabinovitch in honour of his late wife Doris Giller, a former literary editor at the Toronto Star, and is awarded in November of each year along with a cash reward (then CAN$25,000) with the winner being presented by the previous year's winning author.

Since its inception, the Giller Prize has been awarded to emerging and established authors from both small independent and large publishing houses in Canada.

History 
From 1994 to 2004, the prize included a bronze figure created by artist Yehouda Chaki. The current prize includes a trophy designed by Soheil Mosun.

On September 22, 2005, the Giller Prize established an endorsement deal with Canadian bank Scotiabank. The total prize package for the award was increased to $50,000, with $40,000 presented to the winning author and $2,500 each for the other four shortlisted nominees. The award's official name was also changed at that time to the Scotiabank Giller Prize.

In 2006, the prize instituted a longlist for the first time, comprising no fewer than 10 and no more than 15 titles. In 2008, the prize fund was increased to $50,000 for the winning author and $5,000 for each of the authors on the shortlist. In 2014, the prize package was expanded further, to $100,000 for the winning author and $10,000 for each of the shortlisted authors. In 2015, the jury was expanded from three to five people.

Over the years, the Giller Prize has run different promotions to extend its recognition and support of Canadian literary talent to highlight all Canadian fiction eligible for the prize in a given publishing year. For example, the Craving CanLit feature (previously called Crazy for CanLit), which highlights the initial list of all titles that are under consideration for the award's longlist and shortlist nominations, seeks to publicize Canadian literature by engaging readers and writers through social media tools. Another online initiative started in 2021, the Giller Book Club, featuring virtual author readings and interviews, got off to a bumpy start when the inaugural offering was the victim of zoombombing.

Since Rabinovitch's death in 2017, the Giller Prize Foundation is now overseen by his daughter Elana Rabinovitch.

Cultural debate
Following Vincent Lam's win of the Giller Prize in 2006, Geist columnist Stephen Henighan criticized the Giller Prize for its apparent dependency for its shortlists and winners on books published by Bertelsmann AG-affiliated Canadian publishing houses, all of which are based in Toronto.

Arguing that the trend towards centralization of Canadian publishing in Toronto has led to a monopolistic control of the Giller Prize by Bertelsmann and its authors, Henighan wrote, "Year after year the vast majority of the books shortlisted for the Giller came from the triumvirate of publishers owned by the Bertelsmann Group: Knopf Canada, Doubleday Canada and Random House Canada. Like the three musketeers, this trio is in fact a quartet: Bertelsmann also owns 25 percent of McClelland & Stewart, and now manages M&S’s marketing." Henighan added that all of the Giller Prize winners from 1994 to 2004, with the exception of Mordecai Richler, lived within a two-hour drive of downtown Toronto.

The article raised debate within the media and in the wider public over the credibility of the Giller Prize. Henighan revisited that article in 2015.

In 2010, there was much talk about how small presses dominated that year’s shortlist. Montrealer Johanna Skibsrud won the Giller Prize that year for her novel The Sentimentalists, published by independent Gaspereau Press. The company produces books using a 1960s offset printing press and hand-bindery equipment. As a result, while there was great demand for the book in the marketplace, the publisher had trouble keeping up with production. In the end, they turned to Douglas & McIntyre, a large West-coast publisher, to print copies of the book.
 
The Gaspereau situation prompted an examination within the cultural community about what makes a book and the nature of publishing and marketing books. The book also became the top-selling title for Kobo eReaders, outselling even George W. Bush's memoir Decision Points.

Nominees and winners

1990s

2000s

2010s

2020s

References

External links
 

Awards established in 1994
1994 establishments in Canada
Canadian fiction awards
English-language literary awards